The Blindness of Divorce is a 1918 American silent drama film directed by Frank Lloyd and starring Charles Clary, Rhea Mitchell, and Nancy Caswell.

Cast
 Charles Clary as John Langdon 
 Rhea Mitchell as Florence Langdon 
 Nancy Caswell as Florence Langdon - as a child 
 Bertram Grassby as Stanley Merrill 
 Marc B. Robbins as Edward Hopkins 
 Willard Louis as Robert White 
 Fred Church as Burce Livingston 
 Al Fremont as Chief Detective 
 Bertha Mann as Claire Langdon

References

Bibliography
 Solomon, Aubrey. The Fox Film Corporation, 1915-1935: A History and Filmography. McFarland, 2011.

External links

1918 films
1918 drama films
Silent American drama films
Films directed by Frank Lloyd
American silent feature films
1910s English-language films
Fox Film films
American black-and-white films
1910s American films